Rudolph Emile 'Rudy' Tanzi (born September 18, 1958) is the Joseph P. and Rose F. Kennedy Professor of Neurology at Harvard University, Vice-Chair of Neurology, Director of the Genetics and Aging Research Unit, and Co-director of the Henry and Allison McCance Center for Brain Health at Massachusetts General Hospital (MGH). Dr. Tanzi has been investigating the genetics of neurological disease since the 1980s when he participated in the first study that used genetic markers to find a disease gene (Huntington's disease). Dr. Tanzi co-discovered all three familial early-onset Alzheimer's disease (FAD) genes and several other neurological disease genes including that responsible for Wilson’s disease. As the leader of the Cure Alzheimer's Fund Alzheimer's Genome Project, Dr. Tanzi has carried out multiple genome wide association studies of thousands of Alzheimer's families leading to the identification of novel AD candidate genes, including CD33 and the first two rare mutations causing late-onset AD in the ADAM10 gene. His research on the role of zinc and copper in AD has led to clinical trials at Prana Biotechnology (now Alterity Therapeutics). He is also working on gamma secretase modulators (together with Dr. Steven Wagner, UCSD) for the prevention and treatment of Alzheimer's. He also serves as Chair of the Cure Alzheimer's Fund Research Leadership Group and Director the Cure Alzheimer's Fund Alzheimer's Genome Project™.

Dr. Tanzi's team was the first to use human stem cells to create three-dimensional cell culture organoids of AD, dubbed “Alzheimer's-in-a-Dish”. This model was the first to recapitulate all three key AD pathological hallmarks in vitro, and first to definitively show that beta-amyloid directly causes neurofibrillary tangles and filaments. The 3-D model also made drug screening for AD faster and more cost-effective. Using this system, Dr. Tanzi has developed several novel therapies for AD including gamma secretase modulators targeting amyloid pathology, ALZT-OP1 targeting neuroinflammation and a neuroprotective drug combination, AMX0035, which was successful in a clinical trial of ALS.  Dr. Tanzi also discovered that beta-amyloid plays a functional role in the brain as an anti-microbial peptide, supporting a role for infection in AD pathology. Dr. Tanzi serves as Chair of the Cure Alzheimer's Fund Research Leadership Group and numerous advisory and editorial boards, He has published over 600 research papers and has received the highest awards in his field, including the Metropolitan Life Foundation Award, Potamkin Prize, Ronald Reagan Award, Silver Innovator Award, the Smithsonian American Ingenuity Award, and the Brain Research Foundation Award. In 2015, he was named to TIME magazine's list of TIME100 Most Influential People in the World. He co-authored the books Decoding Darkness, and the three international bestsellers, Super Brain, Super Genes, and The Healing Self, with Dr. Deepak Chopra. Dr. Tanzi has hosted three shows public television, regularly appears on television news programs, has testified to Congress on both Alzheimer's disease and brain health, and on occasion serves as a studio keyboard player for Aerosmith, and other musicians.

Publications
Dr. Tanzi has published over 600 scientific papers, including several of the most cited papers in the field of Alzheimer's disease research. Dr. Tanzi also co-authored the books Decoding Darkness: The Search the Genetic Causes of Alzheimer's Disease, the New York Times Best Seller Super Brain: Unleashing the Explosive Power of Your Mind to Maximize Health, Happiness, and Spiritual Well-Being, Super Genes: Unlock the Astonishing Power of Your DNA for Optimum Health and Well-Being, and The Healing Self: A Revolutionary New Plan to Supercharge Your Immunity and Stay Well for Life with Deepak Chopra. Tanzi has made numerous television appearances on shows such as CBS This Morning, the Today Show, NBC Nightly News, Nova, and Dr. Oz. He also hosts the shows Super Brain with Dr. Rudy Tanzi, Super Genes with Dr. Rudy Tanzi, and The Brain Body Mind Connection with Dr. Rudy Tanzi and Dr. Deepak Chopra on PBS television.

Education
Dr. Tanzi received his B.S. in microbiology and B.A.in history from the University of Rochester in 1980. In 1990, he received his Ph.D. in neurobiology at Harvard Medical School, where his doctoral thesis was on the discovery and isolation of the gene that encodes amyloid precursor protein (APP), the precursor to beta-amyloid, which is a pathological hallmark of Alzheimer's disease and generally accepted as the central driver of the disease. The results were published in Science, more or less simultaneously with two other groups in 1986-7.

Research and Awards

At the start of his career in 1980, Dr. Tanzi worked as a research technologist for Dr. James Gusella at Massachusetts General Hospital where he assisted in localizing the Huntington's disease gene, published in Nature in 1983. This was the first human disease gene to be found using genetic linkage and the first set of human genetic markers based on single nucleotide variants.

In 1987, based on his doctoral studies at Harvard Medical School, he was lead author of seven papers published in Science and Nature between 1987 and 1988, describing the initial cloning, mapping and characterization of the gene encoding the amyloid beta-protein precursor (APP). Two other groups reported the cloning of APP at that time, and the gene was shown in 1990 to contain a mutation causing Dutch cerebral hemorrhage with amyloidosis and later in 1991, a mutation causing early-onset familial AD (EO-FAD). In 1992, Dr. Tanzi and ex-trainee, Dr. Wilma Wasco, discovered the two APP family members, APLP1 and APLP2.

In 1995, Dr. Tanzi collaborated with Dr. Peter Hyslop and Dr. Jerry Schellenberg to discover the two other EO-FAD genes, presenilin 1 and 2 (PSEN1 and PSEN2). He has published many key studies characterizing the role of the EO-FAD genes in health and disease. All three genes remain among the most highly studied drug targets in the field of AD, especially with regard to therapeutic strategies aimed at reducing beta-amyloid deposition. In 1993, Dr. Tanzi also first discovered the gene for the neurodegenerative disease, Wilson's disease, published in Nature Genetics. In that same year, he contributed significantly to the discovery of the first familial amyotrophic lateral sclerosis (ALS) gene, SOD1, by providing the key genetic and physical mapping data for chromosome 21 used to find the gene defect, published in Nature, 1993.

As the leader of the Cure Alzheimer's Fund Alzheimer's Genome Project, Dr. Tanzi several other AD genes, most notably, CD33, reported in 2008 with his ex-trainee, Dr. Lars Bertram, in the American Journal of Human Genetics. In that study, Dr. Tanzi reported the first family-based genome-wide association study of AD, which most notably to the identification of the first innate immune AD gene, CD33, which encodes a cell-surface receptor on monocytes and microglia. Three years later, in 2011, in a large case-control AD GWAS consortium study, the National Institute on Aging Alzheimer's Disease Genetic Consortium independently confirmed association of AD with CD33. When first identified as an AD gene, nothing was known about CD33 in the brain or AD pathology. In 2013, Dr. Tanzi and his ex-trainee, Dr. Ana Griciuc first reported in Neuron that increased expression of CD33 in microglial cells in AD brain and showed that a protective CD33 gene variant was associated with reductions in CD33 expression and Abeta levels in AD brain. Importantly, they showed CD33 inhibits microglial phagocytosis and clearance of Abeta and induces pro-inflammatory cytokine release leading to neuroinflammation. They also elucidated the molecular mechanism by which sialic acid binds to CD33 to induce neuroinflammation. In a follow up study published in Neuron in 2019,  Dr. Tanzi and Dr. Griciuc compared the neuroinflammatory effects of CD33 gene to another AD-associated innate immune gene, TREM2. Knockout of CD33 in AD mice attenuated amyloid-beta pathology and improved cognition while knockout of TREM2 led to opposite effects. They then showed that TREM2 functions downstream of CD33 and that crosstalk between CD33 and TREM2 involves the neuroinflammation-related IL-1beta/IL-1RN axis cluster. Since Dr. Tanzi's discovery and characterization of CD33 as the first microglial AD gene, ~700 publications have been published on AD innate immune genes (120 on CD33). CD33 has now emerged as the primary target for novel drug discovery programs aimed at curbing neuroinflammation, at over a dozen pharmaceutical and biotech companies.

Other AD genes Dr. Tanzi has discovered include, among others, ADAM10, UBQLN1, IDE, A2M, ITGB3, and ATXN1. In 2019, Dr. Tanzi, his ex-trainee, Dr. Jaehong Suh, and Dr. Huda Zoghbi (Baylor) led a study published in the journal, Cell, showing that ATXN1 (encoding the spinal cerebellar ataxia gene product, Ataxin-1) controls production of the amyloid beta protein by regulating expression of the gene BACE1.

Over the past two decades, Dr. Tanzi has also contributed greatly to the development of novel therapeutics for AD. Beginning in 1994, in a study published in Science with Dr. Ashley Bush, his post-doctoral fellow at the time, Dr. Tanzi demonstrated a key role for zinc, copper, and iron in beta-amyloid deposition and Lewy body formation. This finding has led to the initiation of AD clinical trials of metal chaperones targeting metal-induced aggregation of beta-amyloid in AD and of alpha-synuclein and Lewy bodies in Parkinson disease (being carried out by Alterity Therapeutics, formally Prana Biotechnology, co-founded by Dr. Tanzi).

Based on numerous studies co-authored by Dr. Tanzi, showing that most familial AD mutations increase the ratio of Abeta42:Abeta40, the key driver of amyloid plaque formation (Scheuner et al. Nature Medicine, 1996, in 2000 Dr. Tanzi and Dr. Steven Wagner began screening for a class of drugs that they termed "gamma secretase modulators (GSM)". GSM's reverse the Abeta42:Abeta40 ratio and thereby prevent the “seeding” of amyloid plaques. Notably, they do not inhibit gamma secretase. Dr. Tanzi and Dr. Wagner have published several pioneering papers on these compounds, and their ongoing drug development efforts, supported by the NIH Neurotherapeutics Blueprint Program and the Cure Alzheimer's Fund, have led to a clinical candidate GSM that is now slated for AD clinical trials in 2021. Many in the field believe that in comparison to beta-secretase inhibitors and Abeta immunotherapy, GSMs may represent one of the safest and economically feasible ways for long-term therapeutic intervention in beta-amyloid deposition.

Also in 2000, Dr. Tanzi collaborated with cell biologist, Dr. Dora Kovacs, to show that blocking the enzyme acetyl-coA acetyltransferase 1 (ACAT1), responsible for storing cholesterol as lipid droplets in intracellular rafts, prevents the generation of Abeta. Most recently, this led to their discovery that ACAT1 promotes the palmitoylation of APP dimers in lipid rafts, rendering them more susceptible to beta-secretase cleavage and Abeta production. They are now testing anti-palmitoylation drugs as well as their own ACAT1 inhibitors as potential drugs for preventing axonal release of Abeta and reducing beta-amyloid deposition.

In 2005, Dr. Tanzi and his ex-trainee and late colleague, Dr. Robert Moir, reported in J. Biol. Chem. the existence of auto-antibodies against oligomeric Abeta, which they showed to protect against risk for AD. This discovery inspired Dr. Roger Nitsch and the Swiss biotech, Neurimmune to develop an AD therapy based on isolating those auto-antibodies from memory B-cells and reverse translating them into the promising beta-amyloid immunotherapy, known as aducanumab, which was recently successful in a phase 3 AD clinical trial by Biogen and Eisai.

In 2014, Dr. Tanzi, and his ex-trainees, Dr. Doo Yeon Kim and Dr. Se Hoon Choi, were the first to use human stem cells to create three-dimensional cell culture organoids of AD, dubbed by the New York Times as “Alzheimer's-in-a-Dish”. This model was the first to recapitulate all three key AD pathological hallmarks in vitro, and, most importantly, resolved a decades long debate as to whether Abeta pathology causes the formation of neurofibrillary tangles. Using this system, they were the first to definitively show that amyloid plaques directly cause neurofibrillary tangles, something that could not be shown in mouse models of early-onset familial AD gene mutations in APP and the presenilins (owing to differences in mouse and human isoforms of the Tau protein, the principle component of neurofibrillary tangles). This 3-D cell culture model/human brain organoid system of AD has also made drug screening considerably faster and more cost-effective. Most recently, using a modified 3-D human stem cell-derived neural-glial cell AD model, Dr. Tanzi has helped develop therapies targeted against neuroinflammation in AD. These include ALZT-OP1 (AZTherapies) targeting microglial activation and neuroinflammation, and a neuroprotective drug combination, called AMX0035 (Amylyx, co-founded by Josh Cohen, Justin Klee with Dr. Tanzi serving as the founding Chair of the Scientific Advisory Board). AMX0035 was successful in a phase 2 clinical trial of ALS and now under consideration for approval by the FDA, while it also being tested in a phase 2 clinical trial in AD patients.

In another set of groundbreaking studies, Dr. Tanzi, working with Dr. Robert Moir, investigated whether amyloid beta (Abeta) may play a normal role in the brain. They demonstrated Abeta to be a potent antimicrobial peptide (AMP) in the brain's innate immune system. After showing that the beta-amyloid protein protects against various infections in different animal models ranging from C. elegans to mouse models, they made the even more striking discovery. They showed that subclinical levels of microbes can rapidly seed (nucleate) amyloid plaques. It has long been held that amyloid plaques require a decade or more to form in the brain. However, injecting either bacteria or virus into the hippocampus of very young AD mice, they showed that amyloid plaques formed overnight. These findings suggest that even subclinical levels of bacteria, viruses, or other microbes, entering or activated in the brain, may initially trigger plaque formation and start the amyloid cascade rolling. Dr. Tanzi is currently carrying out large-scale metagenomic sequencing of post-mortem AD brains, to catalog the microbes that may be initiating amyloid pathology. In 2018, they published back to back papers with a group at Mt. Sinai implicating Herpes viruses in triggering plaque pathology in AD. If successful, these new studies could lead to a new paradigm regarding the etiology of AD and new modes of prevention and treatment, based on targeting microbes that initiate amyloid pathology. Dr. Tanzi and Dr. Moir refer to this as the “antimicrobial protection hypothesis” of AD, and have noted that it may also be relevant to other neurodegenerative diseases, e.g. Creutzfeld-Jacob disease and Parkinson disease, given that the prion protein and alpha-synuclein have since been reported to also have antimicrobial properties.

In other studies, Dr. Tanzi and his ex-trainee, Dr. Zhongcong Xie published several seminal papers providing the first evidence that the widely used general inhalant anesthetic, isoflurane, induces Abeta generation, apoptosis, and neurodegeneration in the mouse brain and in post-operative CSF of patients. This has gradually led to a dramatic reduction in the clinical use of isoflurane in the operating room, especially in elderly patients and Alzheimer's patients. With ex-trainee, Dr. Lee Goldstein, Dr. Tanzi showed how head injury due to bomb blast or collision causes rapid induction of tangles and gliosis in mice. Now referred to as the “bobble head” effect, it has been postulated to be the main cause of subsequent onset of chronic traumatic encephalopathy in human subjects exposed to repeated concussion and head trauma.

Tanzi serves on dozens of editorial and scientific advisory boards, and as Chair of the Cure Alzheimer's Fund Research Leadership Group. He has published over 600 research papers and has been issued numerous patents. He has also co-authored the books "Decoding Darkness: The Search for the Genetic Causes of Alzheimer's Disease" (with Ann Parson), and three international bestsellers (with Dr. Deepak Chopra): New York Times Best Seller, "Super Brain: Unleashing the Explosive Power of Your Mind to Maximize Health Happiness, and Spiritual Well-Being", "Super Genes: Unlock the Astonishing Power of Your DNA for Optimum Health and Well-Being", and "The Healing Self: A Revolutionary New Plan to Supercharge Your Immunity and Stay Well for Life". Dr. Tanzi has hosted three shows on public television: "Super Brain with Dr. Rudy Tanzi", "Super Genes with Dr. Tanzi" and "The Brain, Body, Mind Connection". Dr. Tanzi regularly appears on network television programs, including CBS Morning News, The Today Show, NBC Nightly News, CNN, MSNBC, Dr. Oz, and Nova.

Dr. Tanzi has testified to Congress on both Alzheimer's disease and most recently, in September 2019, on maintaining brain health, when he emphasized the fact that most (98%) gene mutations that predispose to age-related diseases, including Alzheimer's disease do not guarantee disease, but only increase risk. He emphasized that this means that lifestyle choices can make a big difference on the occurrence of age-related disease. Along the lines of the recommendations made in his best selling book, "The Healing Self", he coined the acronym, SHIELD, for remembering how to protect your brain and body, from organ damage, especially due to inflammation/neuroinflammation.

S - Sleep - 7–8 hours per day 
H - Handle Stress - including a meditation practice and taking time to relax
I - Interaction - Stay social and well-integrated with friends and family
E - Exercise - 20–30 minutes of moderate exercise a day 
L - Learn - learn new things to build synaptic/cognitive reserve 
D - Diet - Mediterranean diet and plant-based diet to keep the gut microbiome healthy

SHIELD was first launched on twitter on Tanzi's account (@RUDYTANZI)and went viral. It was later featured in numerous publications, blogs, podcasts, etc, and on television, e.g. on the NBS Nightly News, The Today Show, CBS This Morning, and Dr. Oz. It is now used as the guide for guiding clinical brain healthcare programs at the Mass. General Hospital McCance Center for Brain Health, which Dr. Tanzi co-directs with Dr. Jonathan Rosand and Dr. Gregory Fricchione.

Dr. Tanzi has received numerous awards, including the two highest awards for Alzheimer's disease research: The Metlife Foundation Award for Medical Research in Alzheimer's Disease Award and The Potamkin Prize. He was included on the list of the "Harvard 100 Most Influential Alumni", and was chosen by the Geoffrey Beene Foundation as a “Rock Star of Science”. In 2015, he was named by TIME magazine to the TIME100 Most Influential People in the World list. In 2015, Dr. Tanzi also received the Smithsonian American Ingenuity Award, the nation's highest award for invention and innovation. He also received the Silver Innovator Award, the Brain Research Foundation Award, the Ronald Reagan Award, Pew Scholar Award, Nathan Shock Award, Rustum Roy Award, and the Oneness in Humanity Award.

In 2018, Dr. Tanzi was inducted into the Rhode Island Heritage Hall of Fame, and as a native of Cranston, R.I., he was also inducted into the Cranston Hall of Fame in 2000. Dr. Tanzi was awarded an honorary doctorate from The University of Rhode Island on May 17, 2015.

Summary of Key Discoveries:

 1983: Helped localize the Huntington's disease gene via genetic linkage (with James F. Gusella and Anne Young).
 1984-1988: Was among first to discover the amyloid precursor protein (APP) gene and map it to chromosome 21, for which he produced the first complete linkage map.
 1993: Carried out chromosome 21 physical mapping leading to first familial ALS gene-SOD1.
 1993: Discovered the Wilson's disease gene.
 1993: Carried out physical mapping of chromosome 21 to show SOD1 as the first gene causing familial amyotrophic lateral sclerosis with Dr. Bob Brown (U. Mass.).
 1994: Showed zinc/copper drives Aβ aggregation and neurotoxicity.
 1995: Cloned and discovered first mutations in AD gene presenilin 2; collaborated on the cloning of presenilin 1.
 1999: Mapped the BACE2 gene to the obligate Down Syndrome region of chromosome 21
 2000: Discovered genetic linkage of AD to chromosome 10, implicating the gene encoding the insulin degrading enzyme.
 2001: Showed that AD pathology in transgenic mice could be ameliorated by a zinc-copper chelator, clioquinol (PBT1)
 2003: Clioquinol (PBT1) successful in a phase 2 AD clinical trial. 
 2003: Discovered that apoptosis and caspase activation induces beta-amyloid deposition.
 2005: Discovered ubiquilin 1 to be an AD gene.
 2005: Showed auto-antibodies to oligomeric Aβ protect against AD – acknowledged to have significantly influence the promising AD immunotherapy, Aducanumab.
 2007: Established widely used gene databases: AlzGene, PDGene and SZGene. 
 2008: Employed family-based GWAS to discover the AD gene, CD33, the first AD gene controlling neuroinflammation and innate immunity in the brain, now a major drug target for AD.
 2008: Showed first evidence that isoflurane (a general anesthetic) induces Aβ generation and neurodegeneration, leading to a dramatic reduction in its clinical use.
 2010: Zinc-copper chelator, PBT2 (from Prana Biotechnology, now Alterity Therapeutics) successful in a phase 2 AD clinical trial.
 2010: Discovered the first non-NSAID class of gamma secretase modulators (GSM), which selectively lower production of Aβ42 without off-target effects of gamma secretase inhibitors. A clinical candidate is slated for phase I clinical trials in 2021.
 2010: Discovered and validated the first highly penetrant late-onset AD mutations in ADAM10, the main alpha-secretase that precludes Aβ production in brain.
 2010: Demonstrated Aβ to be a potent antimicrobial peptide in the brain's innate immune system.
 2012: With Dr. Lee Goldstein, first showed that the “bobble head” effect of head injury/concussion causes tangle and gliosis pathology leading to chronic traumatic encephalopathy. 
 2013: Showed that CD33 controls neuroinflammation in AD at the microglial level.
 2014: Invented a 3D human stem cell-derived neural culture AD model that recapitulated for the first time, plaques and tangles in vitro. This was the first model to definitively show that ??amyloid plaques and induce bona fide neurofibrillary tangles from endogenous tau.
 2016: Demonstrated Aβ to be a potent antimicrobial peptide in the brain; showed for the first time in mice and 3D models that microbes can rapidly (overnight) seed deposition of β-amyloid as a defense mechanism of the brain's innate immune system. 
 2018: Invented a new 3D human stem cell-derived mixed neural-astrocyte-microglial microfluidic AD model, which showed neuronal Aβ deposition/tangle formation induces microglial activation and synaptic pruning/axotomy beginning with astrocytic release of MCP1.
 2018: Showed that the amyloid beta protein protects the brain against herpes virus infection.
 2018: Demonstrated the key role of exercise-induced hippocampal neurogenesis in ameliorating AD pathology in AD transgenic mice and successfully mimicked this effect pharmacologically and genetically.
 2019: Demonstrated that ataxin-1, the gene causing spinal cerebellar ataxia, regulates the production of amyloid beta by controlling expression of the BACE1 gene.
 2020: Used multiple whole genome sequencing datasets for the first time to identify sex-specific genetic risk factors for AD (ZBTB7C, GRID1, RIOK3, MCPH1) as well as several novel Alzheimer's disease-associated rare variants in loci related to synaptic function and neuronal development (FNBP1L, SEL1L, LINC00298, PRKCH, C15ORF41, C2CD3, KIF2A, APC, LHX9, NALCN, CTNNA2, SYTL3, CLSTN2, DTNB, DLG2).
 2021: Showed astrocytic interleukin-3 programs microglia and reduces neuroinflammation in Alzheimer's disease. Co-authored successful clinical trial in ALS  leading to approval of Relyvrio (Amylyx).
 2022: Used whole-genome sequencing to discover two new genes associated with using Alzheimer's disease: DTNB and DLG2. Discovered that plasma IL-12/IFN-γ axis predicts cognitive trajectories in cognitively unimpaired older adults.

Music
In musical pursuits, Dr. Tanzi serves as a studio keyboard player for Joe Perry and Aerosmith. He also co-wrote the song tribute to Alzheimer's patients called "Remember Me", performed by singer Chris Mann. He plays keyboards on the albums: Aerosmith: Music from Another Dimension, and Joe Perry: Sweetzerland Manifesto. He has also performed with the legendary opera star, Renee Fleming. His personal website of original piano music is: http://n1m.com/rudytanzi

Bibliography

Books 

Decoding Darkness: The Search for the Genetic Causes of Alzheimer's Disease. Rudolph E. Tanzi and Ann B, Parson, Perseus Publishing, N.Y. 2000.
Super Brain: Unleashing the Explosive Power of Your Mind to Maximize Health, Happiness, and Spiritual Well-Being. Deepak Chopra and Rudolph E. Tanzi, Harmony Books, Random House, 2012.
Super Genes: Unlock the Astonishing Power of Your DNA for Optimum Health and Well-Being. Deepak Chopra and Rudolph E. Tanzi, Rider, Ebury Publishing, London 2015.
The Healing Self: A Revolutionary New Plan to Supercharge Your Immunity and Stay Well for Life. Deepak Chopra and Rudolph E. Tanzi, Harmony, Random House, N.Y. 2018.

Key journal articles

References

External links 

URI Commencement 2015
Official Web page at Harvard 
Official Web page at Massachusetts General Hospital

Living people
Harvard University faculty
American geneticists
American neurologists
Alzheimer's disease researchers
Harvard Medical School alumni
1958 births
University of Rochester alumni